"Jealous Bone" is a song written by Steve Bogard and Rick Giles, and recorded by American country music artist Patty Loveless.  It was released in January 1992 as the second single from her album Up Against My Heart.

Music video

The music video released for this song gives the appearance of being filmed in concert.  However, it was filmed as a video production in front of an audience of Loveless' fans.

The song charted for 20 weeks on the Billboard Hot Country Singles and Tracks chart, reaching number 13 during the week of March 26, 1992.

Chart positions

References

1992 singles
Patty Loveless songs
Song recordings produced by Tony Brown (record producer)
Song recordings produced by Emory Gordy Jr.
MCA Records singles
Music videos directed by John Lloyd Miller
Songs written by Steve Bogard
Songs written by Rick Giles
1991 songs